Marino da Silva  is a Brazilian footballer who plays as a defensive midfielder for Mirassol.

References 

1986 births
Living people
Brazilian footballers
Association football midfielders
Campeonato Brasileiro Série A players
Campeonato Brasileiro Série B players
Grêmio Osasco Audax Esporte Clube players
Atlético Clube Goianiense players
Sport Club do Recife players
São Bernardo Futebol Clube players
People from São Manuel